Sayed Hamed Abdelmoneim (born September 25, 1988, in Cairo) is an amateur Egyptian Greco-Roman wrestler, who played for the men's lightweight category. Abdelmoneim represented Egypt at the 2012 Summer Olympics in London, where he competed for the men's 60 kg class. He received a bye for the preliminary round of sixteen match, before losing out to Georgia's Revaz Lashkhi, who was able to score eight points in two straight periods, leaving Abdelmoneim without a single point. Because his opponent advanced further into the gold medal match, Abdelmoneim was offered another shot for the bronze medal by entering the repechage bouts. Unfortunately, he was defeated in the second round by Russia's Zaur Kuramagomedov, with a three-set technical score (4–1, 0–4, 0–2), and a classification score of 1–3.

References

External links
Profile – International Wrestling Database
NBC Olympics Profile

1988 births
Living people
Egyptian male sport wrestlers
Olympic wrestlers of Egypt
Wrestlers at the 2012 Summer Olympics
Sportspeople from Cairo